Shivpur is a village in Barhara block of Bhojpur district in Bihar, India. As of 2011, its population was 2,084, in 333 households. Arrah is the nearest major city.

References 

Villages in Bhojpur district, India